Queanbeyan High School is a government-funded co-educational comprehensive secondary day school, located in Queanbeyan, in the Southern Tablelands region of New South Wales, Australia.

Established in 1959, the school enrolled approximately 500 students in 2018, from Year 7 to Year 12, of whom 13 per cent identified as Indigenous Australians and 22 per cent from a language background other than English. The school is operated by the NSW Department of Education; the principal is Jennifer Green.

Overview 
The school runs a number of innovative programs including The Personal Best program in which students select to be in these classes if they wish to be challenged and encouraged in their learning: The College Program in which Year 11 and 12 sit for three subjects each year, and sit for the Higher School Certificate. Over two years, students complete 6 subjects but this method reduces the stress, enables more subjects to run, and gives both years of senior study purpose and dignity.

Notable alumni 
Allan Hawke senior public servant, diplomat, former Chancellor of the Australian National University
 David Campese, Rugby Union legend

See also 

 List of government schools in New South Wales
 Education in Australia
 Karabar High School

References

External links 
 
 NSW Schools website

Public high schools in New South Wales
1959 establishments in Australia
Educational institutions established in 1959
Queanbeyan